Henri Poincaré was a French Navy  of the M6 ​​series commissioned in 1931. She participated in World War II, first on the side of the Allies from 1939 to June 1940, then in the navy of Vichy France until she was scuttled at Toulon in November 1942. The Italians seized her, refloated her, and renamed her FR 118, then scuttled her in September 1943. The Germans later scrapped her wreck.

Characteristics

Henri Poincaré was part of a fairly homogeneous series of 31 deep-sea patrol submarines also called "1,500-tonners" because of their displacement. All entered service between 1931 and 1939.

They displaced  on the surface and  underwater. When submerged, their two electric motors produced a combined  and allowed them to reach .

Construction and commissioning

Authorized in the 1925 naval program, Henri Poincaré ws laid down at Arsenal de Lorient in Lorient, France, on 1 March 1927 with the hull number Q140. She was launched on 10 April 1929 at the same time as her sister ship . Henri Poincaré was commissioned on 23 December 1931.

Service history

World War II

French Navy
At the start of World War II in September 1939, Henri Poincaré was assigned to the 4th Submarine Division in the 1st Squadron, home-ported at Brest, France.

The patrols were cancelled on 5 September, when German forces were reported back in their bases.

In November and December 1939, Henri Poincaré and Pascal patrolled in the Atlantic Ocean south of the Azores in search of German U-boats and their supply ships. From 21 to 25 November 1939, the two submarines searched for the German cargo ship Rekum, based on an erroneous report that she had put to sea from Santa Cruz de Tenerife on Tenerife in the Canary Islands.

By May 1940, Henri Poincaré was operating from Bizerte.

German ground forces advanced into France on 10 May 1940, beginning the Battle of France, and Italy declared war on France on 10 June 1940 and joined the invasion. On 16 June 1940, Henri Poincaré and Le  Centaure began a patrol southeast of the Strait of Messina, and at dawn on 22 June 1940 Henri Poincaré tried unsuccessfully to approach three Italian cruisers entering the naval base at Augusta, Sicily. On 25 June 1940, when the Battle of France ended in France's defeat and an armistice with Germany and Italy which went into effect that day, Henri Poincaré returned to Bizerte at 06:40, having had no success during her patrol.

Vichy France
Henri Poincaré subsequently served in the naval forces of Vichy France. After France's capitulation, she initially remained assigned to the 4th Submarine Division at Bizerte. By 1 August 1940, she had been reassigned along  with Pascal to the 5th Submarine Division at Bizerte. 

As of 1 January 1942, Henri Poincaré was assigned to the 5th Submarine Division at Casablanca in French Morocco along with Fresnel, Pascal, and their sister ship . In early 1942, she departed French Morocco to undergo a major overhaul at La Ciotat, France. The overhaul took eight months. Upon its completion, she was placed under guard at Toulon, France, in a disarmed and unfueled state in accordance with the terms of the Armistice of 22 June 1940. After Allied forces landed in French North Africa on 8 November 1942 in Operation Torch, she was authorized to rearm for the defense of Toulon against Allied attack.

Moored at Berth 9 at the Darse Nord du Mourillon with her diesel engines disassembled, Henri Poincaré was not yet able get underway when Germany and Italy occupied the Free Zone of Vichy France on 27 November 1942, and she was among the French vessels scuttled at Toulon to prevent their seizure by Germany when German forces entered Toulon that day.  Germans already had come aboard Henri Poincaré by the time her crew opened her seacocks to scuttle her, and the French crewmen and Germans jostled one another as the French abandoned ship and the enraged Germans rushed below to try to prevent her from sinking. Unfamiliar with submarines, the Germans were unsuccessful and narrowly avoided drowning as they evacuated the sinking submarine.

Italy
The Germans seized Henri Poincaré and handed her over to the Italians. Renamed FR 118 in Italian service, she got underway from Toulon under her own power bound for La Spezia, Italy, on 2 September 1943. The Italians scuttled FR 118 at Genoa, Italy, on 9 September 1943 after Italy surrendered to the Allies and switched to the Allied side in accordance with the terms of the Armistice of Cassibile.

Germany
The Germans seized FR 118s wreck at Genoa on 9 September 1943. They scrapped it at La Spezia. France recovered her diesel engines in 1946.

References

Citations

Bibliography

 
 
 
 

Redoutable-class submarines (1928)
1929 ships
Ships built in Lorient
World War II submarines of France
Maritime incidents in November 1942
Maritime incidents in September 1943
Shipwrecks of France
Shipwrecks of Italy
World War II warships scuttled at Toulon
Lost submarines of France
Naval ships of France captured by Italy during World War II